Steve Mahon (born 6 December 1957) is an Irish retired hurler who played as a midfielder for the Galway senior team.

Born in Kilbeacanty, County Galway, Mahon first played competitive hurling whilst at Ballyturn National School. He made his first impression on the inter-county scene when he joined the Galway under-21 team. He made his senior debut during the 1978-79 National Hurling League. Mahon went on to play a key role for Galway for almost a decade, and won two All-Ireland medals on the field of play and one National Hurling League medal. He was an All-Ireland runner-up on four occasions.

As a member of the Connacht inter-provincial team at various times throughout his career, Mahon won five Railway Cup medals. At club level he is a one-time intermediate championship medallist with Kilbeacanty.

Throughout his career Mahon made 22 championship appearances for Galway. His retirement came following the conclusion of the 1988 championship.

Honours

Player

Kilbeacanty
Galway Intermediate Hurling Championship (1): 1978
Galway Junior C Hurling Championship (1): 1997

Galway
All-Ireland Senior Hurling Championship (2): 1980, 1987
National Hurling League (2): 1986-87
All-Ireland Under-21 Hurling Championship (1): 1978

Connacht
Railway Cup (4): 1980, 1982, 1983, 1986, 1987

Individual

Awards
All-Star (2): 1981, 1987

References

1957 births
Living people
Kilbeacanty hurlers
Galway inter-county hurlers
Connacht inter-provincial hurlers
All-Ireland Senior Hurling Championship winners